The 2017 Stockholm Ladies Curling Cup was held from September 28 to 31 at the Danderyd Curling Arena in Stockholm, Sweden as part of the 2017–18 World Curling Tour. The event was held in a round robin format.

Teams
The teams are listed as follows:

Round Robin Standings

Playoffs

References

External links

Stockholm Ladies Cup
2017 in Swedish women's sport
2017 in women's curling
September 2017 sports events in Europe
2010s in Stockholm